Kutumba Gowravam is a 1957 Indian Telugu-language drama film, produced and directed by B. S. Ranga under the Vikram Studios banner. It stars N. T. Rama Rao and Savitri, with music composed by Viswanathan–Ramamoorthy. The film was remade in Tamil under the same name, banner and director. The film was recorded a commercial success.

Plot 
Gopalam (N. T. Rama Rao), son of a Zamindar (Doraiswamy), leads a happy family life with a compassionate wife, wife Satya (Savitri), stepmother Rangamma (Kannamba), younger brother Pratap (Padmanabham) and a little sister Bala (Baby Uma). Rangamma's distant relative Shankariah (Rajanala) a crooked & cruel person also lives with them. Once Zamindar becomes sick when Shankaraiah forces Zamindar to write a will where he cheats and makes him sign before the villagers. Meanwhile, Pratap becomes a spoiled brat, he tries to make a theft when his father obstructs his way and dies in the mishap. After his death, Shankaraiah slowly poisons Rangamma's mind when misunderstandings arise in the family and they decide to divide the property. Here Shankariah's mischief makes Gopalam get into a wasteland and he also leaves the house. Now Shankariah takes the household authority and shifts them to the city. On the other side, Gopalam & Satya struggle a lot in tilling the wasteland to bring out the water and succeed in cultivating it into a fertile. Parallelly, in the city, Shankaraiah shows heavy losses to Rangamma and steals the money. Moreover, he implicates Pratap in a murder case when Gopalam comes to the rescue, saves his brother, sees the end of Shankaraiah, and protects their family prestige. At last, Rangamma also realizes her mistake and says sorry to Gopalam & Satya. Finally, the movie ends on a happy note with the reunion of the family.

Cast 
N. T. Rama Rao as Gopalam
Savitri as Satya
Rajanala as Shankaraiah
Padmanabham as Pratap
Vangara as Marvadi
Raghuramaiah as Giri
Balakrishna as Pichodu
Doraiswamy as Zamindar
Kannamba as Rangamma
E. V. Saroja as Mohana
Baby Uma as Bala

Soundtrack 
Music composed by Viswanathan–Ramamoorthy. Lyrics were written by Anishetty.

References

External links 
 

1957 drama films
Films scored by Viswanathan–Ramamoorthy
Indian drama films
Telugu films remade in other languages